Jan Paul Strid (July 15, 1947 – December 25, 2018) was a Swedish toponymist who was Professor of Linguistics at Linköping University.

Biography
Strid received his PhD in Nordic languages from Stockholm University in 1981, where he was made a docent in 1982. Since 2002, Strid was Professor of Linguistics at Linköping University. Strid was a well known authority on Swedish place names. He was a regular guest as an expert on linguistics on Sveriges Radio. In 2006, Strid won the prestigious Cnattingius Prize for his pioneering research on the history and culture of Östergötland. He died in Linköping on December 25, 2019.

Selected works
 Runestones, 1991
 Från Mumsmålen till Duvemåla, 2006
 Kulturlandskapets språkliga dimension, 1999
 Tindra: ett landskap i tidens spegel, 2009

References

1947 births
2018 deaths
Linguists from Sweden
Academic staff of Linköping University
Runologists
Stockholm University alumni
Toponymists